Hard spheres are widely used as model particles in the statistical mechanical theory of fluids and solids. They are defined simply as impenetrable spheres that cannot overlap in space. They mimic the extremely strong ("infinitely elastic bouncing") repulsion that atoms and spherical molecules experience at very close distances. Hard spheres systems are studied by analytical means, by molecular dynamics simulations, and by the experimental study of certain colloidal model systems. The hard-sphere system provides a generic model that explains the quasiuniversal structure and dynamics of simple liquids.

Formal definition

Hard spheres of diameter  are particles with the following pairwise interaction potential:

Hard-spheres gas

The first three virial coefficients for hard spheres can be determined analytically

{|
|||=|| 
|-
|||=||  
|-
|||=||  
|}

Higher-order ones can be determined numerically using Monte Carlo integration. We list

{|
|||=|| 
|-
|||=|| 
|-
|||=|| 
|}
A table of virial coefficients for up to eight dimensions can be found on the page Hard sphere: virial coefficients.

The hard sphere system exhibits a fluid-solid phase transition between the volume fractions of freezing  and melting . The pressure diverges at random close packing  for the metastable liquid branch and at close packing  for the stable solid branch.

Hard-spheres liquid

The static structure factor of the hard-spheres liquid can be calculated using the Percus–Yevick approximation.

See also 
Classical fluid

Literature

J. P. Hansen and I. R. McDonald Theory of Simple Liquids Academic Press, London (1986)
Hard sphere model page on SklogWiki.

References

Statistical mechanics
Conceptual models